Black Radio 2 is the sixth studio album by American jazz pianist and R&B producer Robert Glasper (and the second with his Robert Glasper Experiment band), released on October 29, 2013 by Blue Note Records. It is the follow-up to the Grammy Award winner Black Radio released in 2012, and won a Grammy Award for Best Traditional R&B Performance for the album cut "Jesus Children of America" featuring Lalah Hathaway and Malcolm-Jamal Warner in 2015.

Track listing

Personnel 
Credits are adapted from Allmusic.

Robert Glasper Experiment
 Robert Glasper – Fender Rhodes piano, piano, synthesizer
 Casey Benjamin – saxophone, synthesizer, vocoder
 Derrick Hodge – bass
 Mark Colenburg – drums, percussion

Other musicians
 Marsha Ambrosius – Featured Artist
 Brandy Norwood – Featured Artist
 Common – Featured Artist
 Lupe Fiasco – Featured Artist
 Luke James – Featured Artist
 Emeli Sandé – Featured Artist
 Jill Scott – Featured Artist
 Snoop Dogg – Featured Artist
 Patrick Stump – Featured Artist
 Dwele – Featured Artist, Vocal Engineer
 Faith Evans – Featured Artist
 Anthony Hamilton – Featured Artist
 Lalah Hathaway – Featured Artist
 Norah Jones – Featured Artist
 Malcolm Jamal Warner – Featured Artist
 Eric Roberson – Featured Artist
 Jazmine Sullivan – Featured Artist
 Bilal – Featured Artist
 Macy Gray – Featured Artist
 Jean Grae – Featured Artist
 Jahi Sundance – Guest Artist, Turntables
 Wayne Brady – Guest Artist, Vocals
 Michael Eric Dyson – Guest Artist, Vocals
 John P. Kee – Guest Artist, Vocals

Production
 Robert Glasper – Producer
 Eli Wolf – Executive Producer, Producer, A&R
 Nicole Hegeman – Executive Producer
 Terrace Martin – Producer, Vocal Engineer
 Greg Magers – Vocal Engineer
 Josh Mosser – Vocal Engineer
 Any Sun – Vocal Engineer
 Andy Taub – Vocal Engineer
 Larry Whitt – Vocal Engineer
 Keith Lewis – Engineer
 Chris Athens – Mastering
 Qmillion – Mixing
 Steve Cook – A&R
 Marcus Johnson – Assistant
 J.C. Pagán – Creative Director, Design
 Janette Beckman – Photography
 Don Q. Hannah – Photography

Charts

References

2013 albums
Robert Glasper albums
Blue Note Records albums
Sequel albums